Edwin Schneider (May 20, 1874 - April 12, 1958) was an American pianist, teacher, and music editor.  He is best known as the partner and accompanist of Irish tenor John McCormack.  Before meeting McCormack, he was an editor and translator for the John Church Company.

Songs 
 When the Dew is Falling
 Your Eyes

References 

American pianists
Accompanists
1874 births
1958 deaths
American male pianists